Moreton Island is a locality in the City of Brisbane, Queensland, Australia.

Geography 
The boundary of the locality is that of Moreton Island as a whole with the exception of the three separate localities of Bulwer (on the north-west coast), Cowan Cowan (on the west coast) and Kooringal (on the south-west coast).

History 
The locality name of Moreton Island takes its name from the island of the same name, which was named by Lieutenant Matthew Flinders of HM Colonial Sloop Norfolk on 28 July 1799, taking its name from Moreton Bay. The misspelling of the name Morton as Moreton occurred in the published records of the voyage.

References 

Suburbs of the City of Brisbane